3/12 may refer to:
March 12 (month-day date notation)
December 3 (day-month date notation)
3rd Battalion, 12th Marines, an artillery battalion of the United States Marine Corps